Rundu Rural (until 2013 Rundu Rural East) is an electoral constituency in the Kavango East Region of Namibia. It comprises the area east of Rundu, one of Namibia's largest cities. It had a population of 22,538 in 2011, up from 18,250 in 2001.  the constituency had 6,060 registered voters.

The constituency contains the villages of Cuma and Kaisosi. Both villages are connected by a  gravel road which was completed in 2013.

In 2013 the Kavango Region, to which this constituency belonged under the name Rundu Rural East, was split into Kavango East and Kavango West. The constituency was renamed Rundu Rural. Its former sister constituency Rundu Rural West was also renamed, to Ncuncuni Constituency. Ncuncuni now belongs to Kavango West, whereas Rundu Rural belongs to Kavango East.

Politics
The 2015 regional elections were won by Michael Shikongo of SWAPO. He received 1,284 votes. Marcellus Haivera of the All People's Party (APP) came second with 887 votes. The 2020 regional election was won by Nginga Paulus Mbangu, an independent candidate. He received 1,846 votes. The sitting councillor and SWAPO candidate Shikongo came distant second with 654 votes.

See also
 Administrative divisions of Namibia

References

Constituencies of Kavango East Region
Rundu
States and territories established in 1992
1992 establishments in Namibia